Pedro Vega may refer to:
Pedro Vega (bishop) (1560–1616), Spanish bishop
Pedro Vega (born 1958), Mexican footballer
Pedro Vega Granillo (born 1959), Mexican pianist
Pedro Vega (born 1979), Spanish footballer

See also:
Pedro Laso de la Vega (1520–1554), Spanish councilor
Pedro De la Vega (born 2001), Argentine footballer